Tsering Rhitar Sherpa (born 1968) is a Nepalese filmmaker, screenwriter, and film producer. His first film, Mukundo: Mask of Desire, was Nepal's official entry for Oscars.

Early life and education 
Sherpa was born in Nepal "to a Nepalese Sherpa father and a Tibetan origin mother." After completing his Bachelor's degree at Delhi University, he studied filmmaking at Jamia Millia Islamia in Delhi from 1992 to 1993.

Career 
After completing his education, Sherpa made various documentary films, including "Tears of Torture" in 1994, a 27 minute documentary about a Tibetan nun traveling through the Himalayan mountain passes to escape Tibet.

In 1997, he made "The Spirit Doesn't Come Anymore," a documentary film profiling an old Tibetan shaman and his difficult relationship with his son, who would not continue the family vocation. This film earned him the Best Film Award at Film South Asia, 1997 (Festival of South Asian Documentary Films) held in Kathmandu, Nepal, and Best Indigenous Filmmaker of the Year at the Parnu Anthropological Film Festival in Estonia in 1998. This film was also shown at the Leipzig Dokfestival in Germany, Cinema du Reel in France, Hong Kong International Film Festival, Hong Kong, Telluride Mountain Film Festival in the USA, Fukuoka International Film Festival (Focus On Asia) and Yamagata International Film Festival in Japan.

Tsering Rhitar Sherpa's first feature film was “Mukundo: Mask of Desire,” in 2000. The screenplay arose from a newspaper article about a traditional woman healer who had killed a female a woman patient during her healing. "Mukundo is, in the filmmaker's own words, 'an expression and exploration of confusion caused by rituals and beliefs prevalent in the Nepali society.'" In 2000 “Mukundo: Mask of Desire” was selected by the OSCAR committee in Nepal to represent Nepal in the “Best Foreign Film” category.

In 2005-2006, Tsering Rhitar Sherpa made his second feature film, "Karma", about two Buddhist nuns’ journey from the Mustang region.  The film was shown at the San Francisco International Film Festival, Fukuoka International Film Festival (Japan), Tokyo International Film Festival, Vancouver International Film Festival (Canada), Goteberg International Film Festival (Sweden) and Fribourg International Film Festival (Switzerland).

Tsering Rhitar Sherpa continues to make documentary and feature films with the production company Mila Productions.

Personal life 
Sherpa is married and has a son (born 1995) and a daughter (born 2002).

Films 
"Tears of Torture" (1994)
"The Spirit Doesn't Come Anymore" (1997)
Mukudo: Mask of Desire (2000)
 Karma (2006)
 Uma (2013)
 Singha Durbar (TV series) (2015)
 Kalo Pothi: The Black Hen (Producer)
 Seto Surya: White Sun (Producer)

References

External links 

Nepal Film Producer's Association, Recognition for Nepali Cinema
 Yamagata, International Documentary Film Festival 1999, Biography
 Milo productions, Biography
The Spirit Doesn't Come Anymore, UNESCO - audiovisual e-platform

Nepalese film directors
Documentary film directors
Nepalese screenwriters
Sherpa people
Nepalese people of Tibetan descent
1968 births
Living people
Jamia Millia Islamia alumni
21st-century Nepalese screenwriters
20th-century Nepalese screenwriters